Tereza Smitková was the defending champion but lost in the quarterfinals to Monica Niculescu.

Niculescu went on to win the title, defeating Tímea Babos in the final, 6–2, 4–6, 6–3.

Seeds

Draw

Finals

Top half

Bottom half

References

External Links
Main Draw

Ilkley Trophy - Singles